The men's ice hockey tournament at the 1998 Winter Olympics in Nagano, Japan, was the 19th Olympic Championship.  The Czech Republic, which emerged from the dissolution of Czechoslovakia in 1993, won its first winter gold medal, becoming only the seventh nation to win Olympic ice hockey gold. The tournament, held from February 7 to February 22, was played at the Big Hat and Aqua Wing arenas.

This was the first Olympics in which the National Hockey League (NHL) took a break (17 days, from February 8 to February 24) allowing national teams to include NHL players from each country. Unlike basketball's Dream Team in 1992, where the players stayed in a hotel in Barcelona due to security concerns, NHL players stayed in the Olympic Village due to improved security measures.

The Canadian team, despite a strong start in the round robin, lost their semifinal match against the Czech Republic in a shootout. Team Finland defeated Canada in the bronze medal game, disappointing Canadians who wished for Wayne Gretzky to get an Olympic medal. In the final match, the Czech Republic shut-out Russia to win the gold medal, in large part due to a sterling performance by Dominik Hašek.

Qualification

Preliminary round
All times are local (UTC+9).

Group A

Group B

Consolation round

13th place match

11th place match

9th place match

First round

Group C

Group D

Final round

Quarterfinals

{{IceHockeybox
| date        = 18 February 1998
| time        = 18:45
| team1       = 
| team2       = | score       = 4–1
| periods     = (2–1, 2–0, 0–0)
| reference   = 
| goalie1     = Patrick Roy
| goalie2     = Vitali Yeremeyev
| progression = 1–0 / 2–0 / 2–1 / 3–1 / 4–1
| goals1      = Nieuwendyk (Fleury, Roy) – 1:31 / Corson (Lindros) – 2:13 / Shanahan (Gretzky, Bourque) – 36:29 / Yzerman (Gretzky) – 37:01
| goals2      = 3:46 – Shafranov (Koreshkov)
| official    =  Don Adam
| official2   = 
| linesman    =  Kevin Collins
| linesman2   =  Janne Rautavuori
| stadium     = The Big Hat, Nagano, Japan
| attendance  = 9,602
| penalties1  = 14
| penalties2  = 12
| shots1      = 37
| shots2      = 17
| bg          = #EEEEEE
}}

Semi-finals

Bronze medal game

Gold medal game

Statistics

Average age
Team Canada was the oldest team in the tournament, with an average age of 30 years. Team Kazakhstan was the youngest, averaging 26 years and 11 months. The gold medal-winning Czech Republic team averaged 27 years and 2 months. The tournament average was 28 years and 1 month.

Leading scorers

 Medal-winning rosters Source''':
 Gold – 
 Silver – 
 Bronze –

Roster notes
Several of general manager Bobby Clarke's selections for Team Canada were controversial. Eric Lindros was named captain over longtime leaders such as Wayne Gretzky, Steve Yzerman, and Ray Bourque (Clarke at the time was general manager of Lindros's NHL team, the Philadelphia Flyers). Rob Zamuner was a surprise pick, while Mark Messier, Adam Oates, Ron Francis, Doug Gilmour and Scott Niedermayer were omitted. Japanese fans were disappointed when their adopted hero, Paul Kariya, a Canadian of Japanese heritage and one of Canada's best stars, failed to make the Games due to a head injury sustained from a crosscheck by Gary Suter during regular season NHL play.

Memorably, during the shootout in their semifinal match against the Czech Republic, Canadian coach Marc Crawford opted to have defenceman Ray Bourque shoot in the shootout instead of high-scoring forwards Wayne Gretzky and Steve Yzerman. Hockey commentators alternatively criticized Crawford's decision (Bourque, like the other four Canadian shooters, failed to score) or praised it on the grounds that Bourque was one of hockey's most accurate shooters at the time and Gretzky had always been surprisingly mediocre on breakaways.

Controversy
Swedish player Ulf Samuelsson was discovered to have applied for American citizenship. Under Swedish law at the time, when one acquires a foreign passport, their citizenship is annulled. Samuelsson was ejected after having played the first game against Belarus, although Sweden kept their points from the win. The Czech National Olympic Committee felt that Sweden should lose the points and filed a protest with the Court of Arbitration for Sport, which was rejected.

The United States team, loaded with 17 NHL stars, was eliminated in the first game of the knockout round, and responded by trashing their rooms in the Olympic Village. Three apartments were vandalized, ten chairs were broken and three fire extinguishers were emptied. Six of those chairs and one fire extinguisher were thrown down five stories into a courtyard.

Final rankings

 These standings are presented as the IIHF has them, however both the NHL and IOC maintain that all quarterfinal losers are ranked equal at 5th.LA84 foundation Official Report of the XVIII Olympic Winter Games p.168

References

External links
 https://web.archive.org/web/20120613015209/http://hokej.snt.cz/oh/oh1998.html 
 http://www.hockeyarchives.info/JO1998.htm 
 Hockey Nut – 1998 Olympic Hockey 
 Marcolympics – Ice Hockey 1998 
 IIHF: Nagano 1998 in Web Archive 
 la84 foundation – Nagano 1998 Official Report (171–180) 

 
Men's tournament